

Events
Then 14-year-old Salvatore Sabella, future boss of the Philadelphia crime family, murders a local butcher in Sicily, for whom Sabella was an apprentice, who reportedly violently beat the boy. Sabella is sent to prison in Milan in 1908. 
June 2 – Teamsters President Cornelius Shea is accused of taking bribes in order to call off the 1905 Chicago Teamsters' strike. He is acquitted in two trials in January and February 1907.

Births
 Frank "Bomp" Bompensiero, San Diego Mafia Capo and informant  
 Gerardo "Jerry" Catena, Genovese crime family member and National Crime Syndicate leader 
 Gaspar (Gaspare) DiGregorio, Capo in the Bonanno crime family
 Michele Navarra, physician and Capo of a cosca in the Sicilian mafia
 John "Handsome Johnny" Roselli (born Filipo Sacco), Chicago Outfit member 
 Joseph "Joe Bananas" Bonanno, boss of the Bonanno crime family

Organized crime
Years in organized crime